Govinda Bahadur Shrestha (1939 - November 12, 2016) was the Chief Justice of Nepal from 22 January 2004 to 13 January 2005.

References 

Chief justices of Nepal
20th-century Nepalese lawyers
Justices of the Supreme Court of Nepal
1939 births
2016 deaths
21st-century Nepalese judges